Cheng Gwan Min (1917–1994) was a Hong Kong TVB actor. He died in China at the age of 77, reportedly from lung cancer.

A native of Baoan county, Guangdong province, Cheng was once a theatre actor and broadcaster. In 1936, he made his debut in The Three-Day Massacre in Guangzhou in Guangzhou. During his long career of more than half a century, he made more than 200 films, mostly Cantonese.

A skilful imitator of singers from the East and the West, Cheng had numerous albums and performed Cantonese opera and musicals. He earned himself a nickname "Elvis Presley of the East".

From the 1970s onwards, he became a host of the classic variety show Enjoy Yourself Tonight, with occasional guest appearances in films.

Filmography 
 The Three-Day Massacre in Guangzhou (1937)
 A Wealthy Family (1947)
 Separated Too Soon (1948)
 Night Discovery of the Women's Trap (1949)
 A Pitiable Wife (1949)
 Strange Bedfellows (1949)
 Blood-Stained Azeleas (1951)
 The Talking Bird (1959)
 The Orphans (1960)
 Death to the Killer (1960)
 Ali Baba and the 40 Robbers (1960)
 Revolutionary Heroine (1960)
 Temperamental Amazon (1961)
 False Alarm (1962)
 Naughty! Naughty! (1974)
 The Perfect Match (1982)
 Rise of the Great Wall (1985)
 Project A Part II (1987)
 Looking Back In Anger (1989)
 Man from Guangdong (1991)

External links
 
 Hong Kong Cinemagic entry

1917 births
1994 deaths
20th-century Hong Kong male actors